Arvid Källström (17 February 1893 – 27 October 1967) was a Swedish sculptor. His work was part of the art competitions at the 1932 Summer Olympics and the 1936 Summer Olympics.

References

1893 births
1967 deaths
20th-century Swedish sculptors
Swedish male sculptors
Olympic competitors in art competitions
People from Oskarshamn Municipality